The UC Riverside Highlanders men's basketball statistical leaders are individual statistical leaders of the UC Riverside Highlanders men's basketball program in various categories, including points, assists, blocks, rebounds, and steals. Within those areas, the lists identify single-game, single-season, and career leaders. The Highlanders represent the University of California, Riverside in the NCAA's Big West Conference.

UC Riverside began competing in intercollegiate basketball in 1954.  The NCAA did not officially record assists as a stat until the 1983–84 season, and blocks and steals until the 1985–86 season, but UC Riverside's record books include players in these stats before these seasons. These lists are updated through the end of the 2020–21 season.

Scoring

Rebounds

Assists

Steals

Blocks

References

Lists of college basketball statistical leaders by team
Statistical